This is a list of the National Register of Historic Places listings in Pecos County, Texas.

This is intended to be a complete list of properties and districts listed on the National Register of Historic Places in Pecos County, Texas. There are two districts and one individual property listed on the National Register in the county. One property includes a number of Recorded Texas Historic Landmarks.

Current listings

The publicly disclosed locations of National Register properties and districts may be seen in a mapping service provided.

|}

See also

National Register of Historic Places listings in Texas
Recorded Texas Historic Landmarks in Pecos County

References

External links

Pecos County, Texas
Pecos County
Buildings and structures in Pecos County, Texas